Kangaroo Lake is a lake located in Klamath National Forest. There is a nearby campground with both drive-in and walk-in campsites. Non-motorized boats are allowed on the lake, although there is no boat ramp.

See also
List of lakes in California

References

Lakes of Siskiyou County, California
Lakes of California
Lakes of Northern California